Now That's What I Call a Country Christmas is a compilation album released on October 6, 2009, as part of the (US) Now That's What I Call Music! series.

The album is the fifth Christmas-themed album in the series, but the first containing versions performed by country music artists, both contemporary and older artists.

Track listing

Disc one

Disc two

Charts

References 

Now That's What I Call Music! Christmas albums
2009 compilation albums
2009 Christmas albums
Country Christmas albums
Country Christmas